Leon James "Duke" Carmel (April 23, 1937 – August 3, 2021) was an American professional baseball player. Carmel played in 124 games over all or parts of four seasons in Major League Baseball between 1959 and 1965 for the St. Louis Cardinals, New York Mets and New York Yankees, primarily as an outfielder.

Career 
A native of New York City, he graduated from Ben Franklin High School in East Harlem. Carmel signed with the Cardinals in 1955, and in his third minor league season, in the Class C Pioneer League, he was selected to the All-Star team after leading the circuit in runs scored (118) and runs batted in (121). He also batted a career-high .324.

He had his MLB debut in September , starting six games as the Cardinals' center fielder, but he collected only three hits and one base on balls in 24 plate appearances. Beginning the year with the Cardinals, he appeared in 57 games, mostly as a pinch hitter. His first game of 1963, on April 16 against the Pittsburgh Pirates, was a memorable one: as a pinch hitter, he struck a ninth-inning, game-tying home run off Elroy Face, setting the table as the Cardinals scored the winning run two batters later. But by July 18, Carmel was batting only .227 with ten hits in 53 at bats. On July 29, he was traded to the Mets for another outfielder, Jacke Davis.

Carmel then became the Mets' starting first baseman. With regular play, his offensive performance perked up, and on August 8 at the Polo Grounds he had perhaps his best day as a major leaguer. Playing against his old team, the Cardinals, Carmel went three for four, hitting his second career home run in the eighth inning, facing left-handed relief pitcher Bobby Shantz, to win the game, 3–2. Although Carmel had two more three-hit games, on September 2 and 26, he hit only .175 during that month, dropping his season average to .233, with four home runs and 20 runs batted in.

He was then assigned outright to the Buffalo Bisons, the Mets' Triple-A affiliate, for the entire 1964 season. Carmel responded by blasting a career-high 35 homers, four behind league leader Mack Jones' 39. His power display earned Carmel one final MLB trial. Selected by the Yankees in the Rule 5 draft, he began  on the Bombers' roster, playing under his old St. Louis manager, Johnny Keane. But he went hitless in eight at bats, and after May 2 he was sent back to Buffalo. He retired after the 1967 minor league season.  All told, he collected 48 hits in the majors, with seven doubles, three triples and four home runs, batting .211 lifetime with 23 runs batted in.

References

External links

1937 births
2021 deaths
Albany Cardinals players
Billings Mustangs players
Buffalo Bisons (minor league) players
Decatur Commodores players
Houston Buffaloes players
Jacksonville Suns players
Major League Baseball outfielders
New York Mets players
New York Yankees players
Omaha Cardinals players
People from East Harlem
Portland Beavers players
Rochester Red Wings players
St. Louis Cardinals players
St. Paul Saints (AA) players
Spokane Indians players
Baseball players from New York City
Tacoma Giants players
Tulsa Oilers (baseball) players